Mathieu Philippe Peybernes (born 21 October 1990) is a French professional footballer who plays as a centre-back for Apollon Limassol. He was a France youth international having earned caps with the under-18 and under-19 teams.

Career
Peybernes was born in Toulouse, Haute-Garonne. He made his professional debut on 2 May 2010 in a league match against Rennes.

In summer 2014, Peybernes left his first professional club Sochaux for SC Bastia, signing a three-year contract. With this club he will play a total of 34 games all competition included and especially playing during the Final of the Coupe de la Ligue against Paris-Saint-Germain lost by 0–4.

During the next winter market he joined FC Lorient. After the club was relegated to Ligue 2, he was moved to Turkish club of Göztepe SK on loan. In January, however, his loan was terminated and he moved to KAS Eupen also in a temporary deal.

On 2 August 2018, Peybernes moved to Spain after agreeing to a one-year loan deal with Segunda División side Sporting de Gijón. On 24 July of the following year, he signed a permanent three-year contract with fellow league team UD Almería, but was loaned to CD Lugo for the season on 2 September, along with teammate Yanis Rahmani.

Peybernes returned to the Rojiblancos for the 2020–21 campaign, but moved out on loan to Real Zaragoza on 15 January 2021, after being rarely used. He terminated his contract with Almería on 31 July, and signed a two-year deal with fellow second division side Málaga CF on 2 August. He rescinded his contract one year later.

Career statistics

References

External links
 
 
 

1990 births
Living people
Footballers from Toulouse
French footballers
Association football defenders
US Colomiers Football players
FC Sochaux-Montbéliard players
SC Bastia players
FC Lorient players
Göztepe S.K. footballers
K.A.S. Eupen players
Sporting de Gijón players
UD Almería players
CD Lugo players
Real Zaragoza players
Málaga CF players
Ligue 1 players
Segunda División players
Süper Lig players
France under-21 international footballers
France youth international footballers
French expatriate footballers
French expatriate sportspeople in Turkey
French expatriate sportspeople in Belgium
French expatriate sportspeople in Spain
Expatriate footballers in Turkey
Expatriate footballers in Spain
Expatriate footballers in Belgium